Action Team is a British television action comedy spoof made by Shiny Buttons Productions for ITV2. The programme follows the activities of Action Team, a team of British secret agents.

Cast and characters
 Tom Davis as Logan/Vlad: Team leader of Action Team/Interpol's Most Wanted Bad Ass No.5 (who wants to be No.1)
 Vicky McClure as Ruth: Head of MI6, and Logan's boss
 Jim Howick as Graham: Tech wizard on the team that likes Anne
 Laura Checkley as Monica: Logan’s Handler
 Kayode Ewumi as Huxley
 Derek Riddell as Anne
 Charlie Rawes as Sergei
 Wolfgang Cerny as Bogohardt

Episodes

References

External links

2018 British television series debuts
2018 British television series endings
2010s British comedy television series
2010s British satirical television series
British action television series
British parody television series
English-language television shows
ITV comedy
Television series by Endemol